John Sainsbury may refer to:

John James Sainsbury  (1844–1928), co-founder of the major UK supermarket chain Sainsbury's
John Benjamin Sainsbury (1871–1956), eldest son of John James Sainsbury and Sainsbury's chairman 1928–1956
John Sainsbury, Baron Sainsbury of Preston Candover (1927–2022), great-grandson of John James Sainsbury and Sainsbury's chairman 1969–1992
John Sainsbury (cricketer) (1927–2004), cricketer for Somerset